Ghost orchid, is a common name for several orchids, and may refer to:

Dendrophylax lindenii, the American ghost orchid
Epipogium aphyllum, the Eurasian ghost orchid